Waimarino was a New Zealand parliamentary electorate that existed from 1911 to 1954, and from 1963 to 1972. It was rural in nature and was represented by four Members of Parliament.

Population centres
In the 1911 electoral redistribution, the North Island gained a further seat from the South Island due to faster population growth. In addition, there were substantial population movements within each island, and significant changes resulted from this. Only four electorates were unaltered, five electorates were abolished, one former electorate was re-established, and four electorates, including Waimarino, were created for the first time.

The electorate was rural without any urban areas. For the 1914 election, 73 polling stations were used, and at only 15 of them were more than 100 votes cast. These polling stations were in Taihape (878 votes), Ohakune (449), Raetihi (361), Manunui (331), Kakahi (279), Rangataua town hall (273), Ōwhango (270), Ohakune East (167), Fordell (163), Raurimu (158), Horopito (151), Upukongaroa [sic] (127), Umumuri (126), Piriaka (111), and Mataroa (107). The electorate's area stretched from the South Taranaki Bight to Lake Taupo (but not Taupō itself), and from Taihape in the south-east to just outside Taumarunui in the north-west.

In the 1918 Electoral Redistribution, the electorate moved further north. Taumarunui was now within the electorate.

The 1922 Electoral Redistribution resulted in only minimal boundary changes. Significantly, for the first time, part of the population in the electorate was classed as urban (2,144 of 14,587 people, or 14.7%).

The southern boundary moved further north, the boundary near Lake Taupo moved significantly further south, and land was gained in the north-west to near the North Taranaki Bight including the town of Ohura. There was a slight decrease in the proportion of the population that was classed as urban (to 13.6%).

Taihape moved back into the Waimarino electorate. The easternmost part of the electorate went to the  electorate including Tūrangi. In the north, some area was gained from the  electorate. The proportion of the population classed as urban increased to 24.5%.

In 1945, the country quota had been abolished and as a result, mostly rural electorates like Waimarino had to increase significantly in area to compensate for this. Waimarino grew slightly to the south, significantly to the east, and very significantly to the north, and somewhat to the north-west. For the first time, Taupō was fully located within the electorate.

It had again a coastal boundary with the South Taranaki Bight. The western boundary stopped just short of Patea. At the eastern end, Bulls came for the first time into the electorate. In the north, the electorate extended as far as Lake Taupo. Taumarunui was also again included within the electorate.

History
The electorate of Waimarino was first created during the 1911 Electoral Redistribution. The South Island lost one electorate to the North Island in the redistribution, resulting in 42 and 34 European electorates, respectively. Significant population movements within the North Island resulted in significant adjustments, with only four electorates remaining unchanged.

Arthur Remington of the Liberal Party had held the Rangitikei electorate, but he died on 17 August 1909. The resulting  was contested by five candidates, with Frank Hockly as one of the opposition candidates leading Robert William Smith for the government by 1548 votes to 1055. At the time, the Second Ballot Act 1908 applied and since Hockly had not achieved an absolute majority, a second ballot between the two leading contenders was required. In the second contest, Smith had a majority of 400 votes over Hockly and was thus declared elected.

Smith and Hockly progressed to the second ballot, which was won by Smith with a 480 votes majority.

In 1953 Kearins crossed the floor of parliament and voted with the government to support the Licensing Amendment Bill (No. 2). This Bill proposed that the licensing of the King Country, part of Kearins' electorate, be subject to a referendum. However, at the candidate selection for Rotorua, Ray Boord won the nomination over Kearins and was subsequently elected, and "Labour lost its only farming voice... sacrificed by the party machine".

National's Roy Jack, who had previously represented Patea, was the representative.

Members of Parliament
The electorate was represented by four Members of Parliament.

Key

Election results

1969 election

1966 election

1963 election

1951 election

1949 election

1946 election

1943 election

1938 election

1935 election

1931 election

1928 election

1925 election

1922 election

1919 election

1914 election

1911 election

Notes

References

Historical electorates of New Zealand
Bay of Plenty Region
1911 establishments in New Zealand
1954 disestablishments in New Zealand
1963 establishments in New Zealand
1972 disestablishments in New Zealand